Luke Brown (born 8 August 1979) is a British author, editor and critic.

He has a PhD in English Literature from the University of Glasgow and has written for the Financial Times, Times Literary Supplement, London Review of Books and New Statesman. His fiction has also appeared in The White Review. He has also worked as an editor of literary fiction.

His debut novel, My Biggest Lie, was published by Canongate Books in 2014. It was described in a review in The Guardian as "witty and tender".

His second novel, Theft, is set to be published by And Other Stories in 2020.

Novels 

 My Biggest Lie, Canongate. 2014.
 Theft, And Other Stories. 2020 (forthcoming).

References 

Living people
1979 births
Writers from Lancashire
People from Lancaster, Lancashire
English editors
21st-century English novelists
English critics
Alumni of the University of Glasgow